Bon Courage (English: Good luck) was a German educational television series produced by Bayerischer Rundfunk, teaching French as a foreign or second language to German viewers. Produced in 1991 and 1992, the series was divided into three parts of 13 episodes each, focusing on the essentials of the French language in daily life. It is presented by Anouk Charlier. The French actor Diane Stolojan (from Episode 27 Diane Du Mont), Alain Leverrier, Henri Allan Veillet and Gilles Marchais occur in scenes that reflect everyday situations in a humorous way. Anouk Charlier announces the exercises and comments on the films of the French culture and history in German. The title song is the Faust Waltz from the opera Faust by Charles Gounod.

The format of the episodes remains consistent throughout the series, with the opening and closing few minutes presenting a montage and explanation of various sites of cultural and historical importance in the respective cities. The dialogue between the characters is presented in full, followed by an explanation of new vocabulary and grammar rules, after which the dialogue repeats with on-screen text for certain key phrases that the viewer is expected to repeat. Before the closing montage, the viewer is instructed to recreate a similar dialogue based on visual aids provided.

The series is continued in the fourth trimester of the Telekollegs with the first season of C'est ça, la vie.

Episodes

Literature 
 Hannelore Gottschalk, Catherin Marsaud, Franz Baumer: Begleitbuch, Band 1, BRmedia, 2003,  (school book)
 Hannelore Gottschalk, Catherin Marsaud, Franz Baumer: Begleitbuch, Band 2, BRmedia, 2003,  (school book)
 Hannelore Gottschalk, Catherin Marsaud, Franz Baumer: Begleitbuch, Band 3, BRmedia, 2007,  (school book)
 Hannelore Gottschalk, Catherin Marsaud, Franz Baumer: Arbeitsbuch, Band 1, BRmedia, 2001,  (exercise book)
 Hannelore Gottschalk, Catherin Marsaud, Franz Baumer: Arbeitsbuch, Band 2, BRmedia, 2003,  (exercise book)
 Hannelore Gottschalk, Catherin Marsaud, Franz Baumer: Arbeitsbuch, Band 3, BRmedia, 2003,  (exercise book)

MCs 
 Bon courage, Audiocassette zum Begleitbuch 1, 
 Bon courage, Audiocassette zum Begleitbuch 2
 Bon courage, Audiocassette zum Begleitbuch 3, 
 Bon courage, Audiocassette zum Arbeitsbuch 1,
 Bon courage, Audiocassette zum Arbeitsbuch 2, 
 Bon courage, Audiocassette zum Arbeitsbuch 3,

DVD 
Bon Courage, 39 Folgen, BR Mitschnittservice

References

See also
C'est ça, la vie
List of German television series

German educational television series
1991 German television series debuts
1992 German television series endings
French-language education television programming
Das Erste original programming
Bayerischer Rundfunk